Abdul Ahad (18 January 1918 – 14 May 1996) was a Bangladeshi composer, music director and singer. He was the recipient of Independence Day Award in 1978. The Government of Pakistan awarded him Tamgha-e-Imtiaz in 1962 and Sitara-i-Imtiaz in 1969 for his contribution to music.

Early life
Ahad was born in Rajshahi in the then Bengal Presidency. He took lessons from Ustad Bali and Ustad Manju Sahib. He took part in the All-Bengal Music Competition in 1936 and stood first in the Thumri and Ghazal section. In 1938, he won a scholarship from Shantiniketan as the first Bengali Muslim student. In Santiniketan, he sang the song Diner Por Din Je Gelo and was beloved by Rabindranath Tagore.

Career
After spending four years at Santiniketan, he joined Master's Voice in Calcutta in 1941 as a music teacher. Artistes including Pankaj Mullick and Hemanta Mukherjee recorded Tagore songs under his direction. In 1941, Ahad joined HMV Calcutta and gradually became a music director for the recording industry as well as the film industry. He got success as a music director in feature films such as Duhkhe Jader Jiban Gada, Asiya (1960), Nabarun and Dur Hyay Sukh Ka Gaon. After the 1947 Partition of India, Ahad joined Radio Pakistan and became a key person in the musical arena of Dhaka. He introduced many new talents to the music world, composed numerous songs and wrote several books on Bengali music.

Some of his compositions include:

 Ami shagorer o neel
 Amar desher matir gondhey
 Onek brishti jhorey tumi eley
 Bhramarer pakhna jotodur jak na

References

Further reading
 

1918 births
1996 deaths
People from Rajshahi District
Bangladeshi male musicians
Bangladeshi music directors
Recipients of Sitara-i-Imtiaz
Recipients of Tamgha-e-Imtiaz
Recipients of the Independence Day Award
Honorary Fellows of Bangla Academy
20th-century male musicians
Pakistani musicians